Emblem of Korea may refer to several different emblems over different time periods and locales:

Emblem of North Korea
Emblem of South Korea
Imperial Seal of Korea
Taegeuk

Korean culture